A dip pen or nib pen or pen nib usually consists of a metal nib with capillary channels like those of fountain pen nibs, mounted in a handle or holder, often made of wood. Other materials can be used for the holder, including bone, metal and plastic; some pens are made entirely of glass.

Generally, dip pens have no ink reservoir, so the user must refill the ink from an ink bowl or bottle to continue drawing or writing. Sometimes a simple tubular reservoir can be clipped to the top of the pen, allowing for several minutes of uninterrupted use. Refilling can be done by dipping into an inkwell, but it is also possible to charge the pen with an eyedropper, a syringe, or a brush, which gives more control over the amount of ink applied. Thus, "dip pens" are not necessarily dipped; many illustrators call them nib pens.

Dip pens emerged in the early 19th century, when they replaced quill pens and, in some parts of the world, reed pens. Dip pens were generally used before the development of fountain pens in the later 19th century, and are now mainly used in illustration, calligraphy, and comics.

While a fountain pen offers the convenience of less frequent refills, the dip pen has certain advantages over a fountain pen. It can use waterproof, pigmented, iron gall ink, particle-and-binder-based inks, such as India ink, drawing ink, and acrylic inks with ease; while fountain pens generally must use water based inks, require thorough and frequent cleaning to prevent clogging when used with pigmented or waterproof inks and may corrode when used with iron gall ink. Dip pen nibs may also corrode when used with iron gall ink but this is not as likely nor as problematic as the nib of a dip pen is often cleaned after each use, and is easily replaced. Dip pens are also more sensitive to variations of pressure and speed, producing a line that naturally varies in thickness.

There is a wide range of exchangeable nibs for dip pens, so different types of lines and effects can be created. The nibs and handles are far cheaper than most fountain pens, and allow color changes much more easily.

History 

The earliest known split-nib metal dip pen is a surviving copper-alloy pen found in Roman Britain (AD 43 to 410).  Several other surviving all-metal and removable-nib pens from the Middle Ages and Renaissance have been found, suggesting they were used alongside quill pens.

The steel pen is first attested in Daniel Defoe's book A Tour Through the Whole Island of Great Britain – 1724–26. In Letter VII Defoe wrote: "the plaster of the ceilings and walls in some rooms is so fine, so firm, so entire, that they break it off in large flakes, and it will bear writing on it with a pencil or steel pen." In Newhall Street, John Mitchell pioneered mass production of steel pens in 1822; prior to that the quill pen had been the most common form of writing instrument. His brother William Mitchell later set up his own pen making business in St Paul's square. The Mitchell family is credited as being the first manufacturers to use machines to cut pen nibs, which greatly sped up the process.

The Jewellery Quarter and surrounding area of Birmingham, England was home to many of the first dip pen manufacturers, which some companies establishing there to produce pens. Some of those companies were Joseph Gillott's (established in 1827), Sir Josiah Mason (1827), Hink Wells & Co. (1836), Baker and Finnemore (1850), C. Brandauer & Co. (1850), D. Leonardt & Co. (1856).

Baker and Finnemore operated in James Street, near St Paul's Square. C Brandauer & Co Ltd., founded as Ash & Petit, traded at 70 Navigation Street. Joseph Gillott & Sons Ltd. made pen nibs in Bread Street, now Cornwall Street. Hinks Wells & Co. traded in Buckingham Street, Geo W Hughes traded in St Paul's Square, D. Leonardt & Co./Leonardt & Catwinkle traded in George Street and Charlotte Street, and M Myers & Son. were based at 8 Newhall Street. By 1830 John and William Mitchell, Joseph Gillott and Josiah Mason were the major manufacturers in Birmingham.

In Germany the industrial production of dip pens started in 1842 at the factory of Heintze & Blanckertz in Berlin.

By the 1850s, Birmingham was a world centre for steel pen and steel nib manufacture. More than half the steel nib pens manufactured in the world were made in Birmingham. Thousands of skilled craftsmen and women were employed in the industry. Many new manufacturing techniques were perfected in Birmingham, enabling the city's factories to mass produce their pens cheaply and efficiently. These were sold worldwide to many who previously could not afford to write, which encouraged the development of education and literacy. By 1860 there were about 100 companies making steel nibs in Birmingham, but 12 large firms dominated the trade. In 1870 Mason, Sommerville, Wiley, and Perry, merged to form Perry & Co. Ltd. which later became one of the largest manufacturers in the world, with near 2,000 employees.

Richard Esterbrook manufactured quill pens in Cornwall. In the 19th century, he saw a gap in the American market for steel nib pens. Esterbrook approached five craftsmen who worked for John Mitchell in Navigation Street with a view to setting up business in Camden, New Jersey, US. Esterbrook founded his company in 1858, and it grew to become one of the largest steel pen manufacturers in the world. In 1971 it went out of business.

The oblique dip pen was designed for writing the pointed pen styles of the mid 19th to the early 20th century such as Spencerian Script, although oblique pen holders can be used for earlier styles of pointed penmanship such as the copperplate scripts of the 18th and 19th centuries. As the name suggests, the nib holder holds the nib at an oblique angle of around 55° pointing to the right hand side of the penman. This feature helps greatly in achieving the steep angle required for writing certain scripts, but more importantly, it prevents the right hand nib tine from dragging on the paper as can be experienced when using a straight nib holder with a straight nib for this purpose.

The decreasing production of dip pens and the subsequent demise of the industry in Birmingham is often blamed on the invention of the ballpoint pen in 1938 by the Hungarian Laszlo Biro.

One improved version of the dip pen, known as the original "ballpoint", was the addition of a curved point (instead of a sharp point) which allows the user to have slightly more control on upward and sideways strokes. This feature, however, produces a thicker line rather than the razor-sharp line produced by a sharp point.

Pen makers 
The following is a list of some of the most prominent dip pen manufacturers (in past and present times):

Uses

Dip pens continued in use in schools into the 1950s and 1960s, mainly on grounds of cost, since fountain pens were expensive to buy. Even when ballpoint pens became cheaply available, some schools banned their use, perhaps because writing with a dip pen had to be done with greater care. School desks were made with a socket for a small ceramic inkwell which had to be refilled on a daily basis, a task often delegated to one of the pupils.

Dip pens are rarely used now for regular writing, most commonly having been replaced by fountain pens, rollerball pens, or ballpoint pens. However, dip pens are still appreciated by artists, as they can make great differences between thick and thin lines, and generally write more smoothly than other types of pens. Dip pens are also preferred by calligraphers for fine writing. Dip pens are still in use for nib paintings, mostly round tip ones with a slit in the centre.

Although most of the factories ceased manufacturing dip pens, some companies are still active, such as Speedball, Brause (currently owned by French company Exacompta Clairefontaine), William Mitchell and Joseph Gillott's.

Gallery

See also
 Birmingham pen trade
 Calligraphy
 Lettering
 Nib (pen)

References

External links

 Kallipos, Calligraphy German website
 Manuscript Pen Company
 Scribblers, calligraphy website
 Blam! Design, calligraphy and vintage pens
 The Pen Museum at Birmingham Heritage forum
 Birmingham Pen Room, writing and pen museum (Archive)

Writing implements
Visual arts materials
Pens